Watford may refer to:

Towns
 Watford, a town in Hertfordshire, England
 Watford (UK Parliament constituency), a constituency serving Watford, Hertfordshire
 Watford F.C., a football club based in Watford, Hertfordshire
 Watford Borough Council, the local authority for the Watford non-metropolitan district
 Watford, Northamptonshire, a village in Northamptonshire, England
 Watford Gap, near the Northamptonshire village
 Watford, a town in Ontario, Canada. Now merged with Warwick, Ontario
 Watford City, North Dakota, United States

People
 Christian Watford (born 1991), US basketball player
 Gwen Watford (1927–1994), English actress
 Jerry Watford (1930–1993), US football player
 Miyah Watford (born 1998), US and Iceland football player
 Stephen Watford (fl. 1384-1388), English politician

See also
Walford (disambiguation)
Waterford (disambiguation)